A Family Affair is a Philippine drama television series broadcast by Kapamilya Channel. Directed by Jerome Pobocan and Raymund Ocampo, it stars Ivana Alawi, Gerald Anderson, Sam Milby, Jameson Blake and Jake Ejercito. The series aired on the network's Primetime Bida evening block, A2Z, TV5, and worldwide via The Filipino Channel from June 27 to November 4, 2022, replacing The Broken Marriage Vow and was replaced by Flower of Evil.

The series is streaming on Netflix on November 5, 2022.

Cast and characters
Main cast
 Ivana Alawi as Cherry Red Magwayen-Estrella
 Gerald Anderson as Francisco "Paco" Estrella
 Sam Milby as Dave Estrella
 Jameson Blake as Andrew "Drew" Estrella
 Jake Ejercito as Sebastian "Seb" Estrella

Supporting cast
 Edu Manzano as Frederico "Freddie" Estrella
 Ana Abad Santos as Everly "Ebs" Magwayen
 Lito Pimentel as Apolinario Panyong"Magwayen
 Rans Rifol as Colleen de Jesus-Estrella
 Aya Fernandez as Rebecca Lazaro
 Heaven Peralejo as Victoria "Tori" Simbulan
 Claire Ruiz as Florabelle Ramirez
 Lloyd Samartino as Gov. Elvis Arevalo

Guest cast
 Dawn Zulueta as Carolina "Carol" Estrella
 Jong Cuenco as Mayor Arturo Villanueva
 Jonic Magno as Lando Esquivel
 Mona Alawi as young Cherry Pie
 Louise Abuel as young Paco
 Anthony Jennings as young Dave
 Jesse James Ongteco as young Seb
 Robbie Wachtel as young Drew
 Sienna Stevens as Malaya Magwayen

Production
The series began pre-production in 2019 as Kahit Minsan Lang, with Bea Alonzo, Richard Gutierrez, Rafael Rosell and Christian Bables initially part of the cast. Principal photography began in early 2020. However, it was temporarily halted due to the lockdown caused by the COVID-19 pandemic. On late June 2020, it was announced that Kahit Minsan Lang was cancelled.

On April 8, 2022, Star Creatives TV has confirmed the official main cast of A Family Affair. The official trailer was released on May 26, 2022.

Episodes

Season 1

Season 2

Reception 
The official trailer of A Family Affair garnered 1.7 million views in less than six hours on Facebook. According to Manila Bulletin, the trailer gained more than 7 million views, two weeks since it was premiered. A Family Affair is also consistently among the top shows on the streaming service iWantTFC, becoming the third most watched show on the platform.

Upon its availability on the streaming service Netflix, the series immediately became a hit and became the most watched TV show on the platform.

Accolades

Notes

References

External links 
 

ABS-CBN original programming
ABS-CBN drama series
Philippine romance television series
Philippine melodrama television series
Philippine thriller television series
2022 Philippine television series debuts
2022 Philippine television series endings
2020s Philippine television series
Filipino-language television shows
Television series by Star Creatives
Television shows set in the Philippines